Baume or Baumé may refer to:

Places in France
 Baume-les-Dames, a commune in the Doubs department
 Baume-les-Messieurs, formerly Baume-les-Moines, a commune in the Jura department
 Baume Abbey, near Baume-les-Messieurs
 Saint-Maximin-la-Sainte-Baume, a commune in the Var department

Other
 Baume (surname)
 Baume et Mercier, Swiss watchmaker company
 Baume (watch), Swiss watch brand, subsidiary of Baume & Mercier
 Baumé scale
 Baumé Restaurant, French restaurant in California, US